Felix Collins , is a Canadian educator, lawyer and politician from Newfoundland and Labrador, and a former Attorney General. Collins served as the member of the House of Assembly for Placentia—St. Mary’s from 2006 to 2015 for the Progressive Conservatives.

Collins entered cabinet in 2009 being appointed Minister of Justice and Attorney General. In 2012, he became Minister of Intergovernmental and Aboriginal Affairs. The following year Collins left cabinet when his portfolio was merged with other departments, only to re-enter cabinet months later when he was named Attorney General by Premier Tom Marshall. Collins also served as Attorney General in the Davis government. Collins was a notable figure in the Bill 29, Access to Information and Protection of Privacy Act debate in 2012.

Education
Collins graduated from Memorial University of Newfoundland with a Bachelor of Arts degree in education in 1964 and a Bachelor of Arts degree in 1968. He completed his master's degree in education in 1972 at the University of Boston. In 1995, Collins completand a Bachelor of Laws degree from the University of Ottawa.

Career
Collins worked as a school principal, teacher, coordinator and a superintendent of education until retirement in 1992, at which time he entered law school. In April 1996, he was called to the Newfoundland Bar and is a member of the Law Society of Newfoundland, he practiced law in St. John’s until 2007.

Politics
Collins was mayor of the Town of Placentia for sixteen years and a member of the Placentia Council for nineteen years. He was chairperson of the first Joint Councils of the Placentia area and served as Chairperson of the Placentia Area Recreation Commission. He was one of the founding directors of the Placentia Health Care Board, and served eight years as its vice-president. He served six years on the Board of Directors of Marine Atlantic.

In February 2006, Collins was elected to the Newfoundland and Labrador House of Assembly for the District of Placentia—St. Mary’s in a by-election, replacing Fabian Manning who had been removed from the Progressive Conservative caucus. Collins was re-elected in the 2007 provincial election.

Collins is a member of the Progressive Conservative Party and as Member of the House of Assembly (MHA) he served as Deputy Chair of Committees, Chair of the Elections and Privileges Committee, and a Member of the Public Accounts Committee. He has also served as Legislative Advisor to the Minister of Natural Resources and as Commissioner for the St. John’s Urban Region (Agricultural) Development Area Boundary Review. In a cabinet shuffle in October 2009, Premier Danny Williams appointed him to serve as Newfoundland and Labrador's Minister of Justice and Attorney General.

Collins remained Justice Minister and Attorney General under Premier Kathy Dunderdale until October 19, 2012, when he was demoted and became Minister of Intergovernmental and Aboriginal Affairs. Following the 2013, provincial budget, which saw major spending cuts throughout government, it was announced that Collins' cabinet post would be eliminated. Effective June 1, 2013, Premier Dunderdale would take over the Intergovernmental Affairs portfolio, while an Office of Labrador and Aboriginal Affairs would be created. Collins was succeeded by MHA Keith Russell as Labrador and Aboriginal Affairs Minister in 2014.

Collins returned as Attorney General from March 2015 to December 2015 following the removal of Judy Manning.

He did not run for re-election in the 2015 provincial election.

Election results

|-

|-

|NDP
|Trish Dodd
|align="right"|1,475
|align="right"|29.23%
|align="right"|
|-

|- bgcolor="white"
!align="left" colspan=3|Total
!align="right"|
!align="right"|100.0%
!align="right"|
|}

|-

|-

|NDP
|Jennifer Coultas
|align="right"|812
|align="right"|20.83%
|align="right"|
|- bgcolor="white"
!align="left" colspan=3|Total
!align="right"|3,098
!align="right"|100.0%
!align="right"|
|}

References

External links
Felix Collins' PC Party biography

Living people
Lawyers in Newfoundland and Labrador
Members of the Executive Council of Newfoundland and Labrador
Progressive Conservative Party of Newfoundland and Labrador MHAs
Newfoundland and Labrador municipal councillors
21st-century Canadian politicians
Year of birth missing (living people)